Asedio is a 2023 Spanish-Mexican thriller film directed by Miguel Ángel Vivas and written by Marta Medina which stars Natalia de Molina and Bella Agossou.

Plot 
In the wake of getting involved in a corruption case, riot police agent Dani switch sides during a home eviction, teaming up with irregular immigrant and evictee Nasha as well as the latter's son Little.

Cast

Production 
Based on an original story by Miguel Ángel Vivas and José Rodríguez, the film was written by Marta Medina. It was produced by Apache Films (Enrique López Lavigne) alongside México City Project, in association with Sony Pictures International Productions and the participation of RTVE and Amazon Prime Video. Filming lasted from October to November 2021. Shooting locations included Madrid.

Release 
Asedio was selected for screening in March 2023 in the 26th Málaga Film Festival's 'Malaga Premiere' lineup, the official selection's non-competitive slate. Distributed by Sony Pictures Entertainment Iberia, it is scheduled to be released theatrically in Spain on 5 May 2023.

Reception 
Eduardo Parra of La Opinión de Málaga deemed Asedio to be one of the best films of the year, "social, human, police, and pure action [cinema] and one of those movies that stay in your head and you cannot get them out".

See also 
 List of Spanish films of 2023

References 

Spanish action thriller films
Mexican action thriller films
Apache Films films
Films shot in Madrid
2020s Spanish-language films
2020s Spanish films
2020s Mexican films
2023 action thriller films